The department of information technology formerly known as the Government Computer Bureau, is in the ministry of transport and communications from a department called the Ministry of communications science and technology.

Services Offered by the department of information technology
The department of information technology has several major services it provides to the government of Botswana, including the following:
 Government website hosting
 Creating internet connectivity and other information technology related services across the public sector of Botswana

References

External links

Government of Botswana